Nowjeh Deh (also known as Navābī, Navādeh, Novābī, Novādeh Pīr, Nuvābi, and Nuvady) is a village in Tazeh Kand Rural District, Khosrowshahr District, Tabriz County, East Azerbaijan Province, Iran. At the 2006 census, its population was 2,057, in 372 families.

References 

Populated places in Tabriz County